The 2016–17 season was R&F's first season in the top-tier division in Hong Kong football. R&F competed in the Premier League, Senior Challenge Shield, FA Cup and Sapling Cup in this season.

On 1 August 2016, R&F (Hong Kong) was accepted to play in the Hong Kong Premier League with following conditions: (1) Signing at least eight Hong Kong players. (2) Using at least three Hong Kong players in a match. (3) Non-Chinese/Hong Kong player could not be registered in the club. (4) Sponsoring a cup competition with a fee of $1 million. The club finished their inaugural season in 10th place with 3 wins, 1 draw and 16 defeats in the 2016–17 Hong Kong Premier League, which secured to stay in the top flight for the next season.

Coaching staff
{|class="wikitable"
|-
!Position
!Staff
|-
|Head coach|| Li Zhihai
|-
|Team leader||rowspan="2"| Leung Chi Wing
|-
|Assistant coach
|-
|Team physician|| Chen Liang
|-
|Physiotherapist|| Liu Zhixing

Squad

Summer
As of 4 September 2016

Winter
As of 1 April 2017

Transfers

In

Summer

Winter

Out

Winter

Pre-season and friendlies

Training matches

Competitions

BOC Life Hong Kong Premier League

Table

Results by round

Results summary

League Matches

HKFA Canbo Senior Shield

CODEX FA Cup

R&F Properties Sapling Cup

Statistics

Appearances and goals

Goalscorers

Disciplinary record

References

R&F (HK) seasons
Hong Kong football clubs 2016–17 season